"Entre beso y beso" (English: "Between kiss and kiss") is a Banda song recorded by Mexican ensemble La Arrolladora Banda El Limón de René Camacho. Written by Aarón "La Pantera" Martínez and produced by Fernando Camacho, the song was released on October 28, 2017 as the lead single from the eponymous album.

Josi Cuen provides vocals for the song. "Entre beso y beso" is the first single released by La Arrolladora after the departure of their previous lead singer, Jorge Medina, who had been with the ensemble for 19 years. The single topped the Mexican charts, and it also charted in Guatemala and the United States.

Charts

Release history

See also
List of number-one songs of 2018 (Mexico)
List of number-one Billboard Regional Mexican Songs of 2018

References

2017 singles
Spanish-language songs
2017 songs
Monitor Latino Top General number-one singles
La Arrolladora Banda El Limón songs